Dauda Bortu (born 4 September 1996 in Monrovia) is a Liberian footballer who plays as a forward.

International career
Bortu was born in Liberia, but raised and naturalized as a Norwegian citizen. He was called up and capped by the Liberia national football team in a 5–0 Africa Cup of Nations qualifying win against Djibouti.

Club career
Bortu came through the youth system of Bærum SK, but was released after the 2016 season. He only featured in one 2016 Norwegian Football Cup game. After fifteen months without a club he signed for fellow third-tier club FK Mjølner in 2018. In 2019 he went on to Nybergsund. After only 1 game he moved on to neighbours Trysil.

References

External links
 

1996 births
Living people
Sportspeople from Monrovia
Liberian footballers
Liberian expatriate footballers
Liberia international footballers
Liberian emigrants to Norway
Sportspeople from Bærum
Bærum SK players
FK Mjølner players
Association football forwards
Nybergsund IL players
Dauda Bortu
Norwegian Second Division players
Dauda Bortu